The Casket is a weekly paper published in Antigonish, Nova Scotia, Canada, by SaltWire Network.

First published on June 24, 1852 by John Boyd, The paper was eventually acquired by Casket Printing and Publishing Company.

Brace Publishing Limited, a division of the Halifax newspaper The Chronicle Herald, acquired the newspaper in 2012 before being subsumed into the Chronicle Herald's expanded SaltWire Network in 2017.   

Staff have included the noted cartoonist, Bruce MacKinnon, who worked for the paper as a youth.

References

Weekly newspapers published in Nova Scotia
Antigonish, Nova Scotia
Publications established in 1852
1852 establishments in the British Empire
SaltWire Network publications
Canadian Gaelic